The Renal Support Network (RSN) is an American nonprofit, kidney patient-focused, kidney patient-run organization that works to benefit individuals affected by chronic kidney disease (CKD). RSN's mission is to help patients develop their personal coping skills, talents, and employability by educating and empowering them (and their family members) to take control of the course and management of the disease.

RSN works to achieve its mission through its national patient meeting and regional patient lifestyle meetings and the RSN Patients Educating Patients & Professionals (PEPP) Patient Speakers Program. Information and education programs include the Kidney Times website and the KidneyTalk biweekly podcast. RSN sponsors Renal Teen Proms in Los Angeles and Washington, DC.

The Renal Support Network also works to provide lawmakers and policymakers with patient perspectives on the needs and capabilities of people with CKD. RSN does this through their Wellness & Education Kidney Advocacy Network (weKAN).

History 
The Renal Support Network was founded in 1993 by Lori Hartwell.

Meetings 
The national meeting is a three-day conference held in conjunction with the National Renal Administrators Association (NRAA) annual meeting. Regional Patient Lifestyle meetings are free to attend.

Activities 
In addition to contributing to educational and scientific publications, the Wellness & Education Kidney Advocacy Network (weKAN) consists of chronic kidney disease (CKD) patient activists from across the country whose common goal is to ensure that people with CKD receive quality care.

The PEPP Patient Speakers Program was initiated by RSN in 2005.  Since then, there have been over 100 speaking engagements to more than 9800 listeners.  These educational programs are led by CKD patient-speakers who have been professionally trained, tested and certified to deliver these programs at meetings of renal patients and healthcare professionals. PEPP speakers are available at no charge to organizations that meet the RSN criteria.

"Kidney Times" is the organization's CKD information website; all articles are all written by people with CKD or health care professionals. A stipend is paid for articles published. Kidney Talk is a biweekly webcast hosted by Stephen Furst and RSN Founder and President Lori Hartwell.

Renal Teen Proms are free events are for teens ages 14 to 24 who have CKD and a guest of their choice.  Attendees are treated to dancing and limo rides, dinner and appetizers, glamor photos, and a DJ.

References

External links
 Renal Support Network

Health charities in the United States
Disability organizations based in the United States
Kidney organizations
Patients' organizations
Charities based in California
Medical and health organizations based in California